Mangelia miostriolata is a minute extinct species of sea snail, a marine gastropod mollusk in the family Mangeliidae.

Description
The length of the shell attains 4 mm.

Distribution
This extinct marine species was found in Miocene strata of  the Netherlands

References

  Janssen, A.W., 1984. Mollusken uit het Mioceen van Winterswijk-Miste. Een inventarisatie, met beschrijvingen en afbeeldingen van alle aangetroffen soorten. Amsterdam (K.N.N.V., N.G.V. &R.G.M.), 451 pp., 7 figs, 4 tabs, atlas with 82 pis
 A.C. Janse & A.W. Janssen, The mollusc fauna of the Stemerdink Bed (Miocene, Reinbekian) from outcrops in the Slinge brook at Winterswijk-Brinkheurne (The Netherlands, province of Gelderland); Mededelingen van de Werkgroep voor Tertiaire en Kwartaire Geologie, vol 20 (1983) nr. 3 p. 105-140

External links
 Worldwide Mollusc Species Data Base : Mangelia miostriolata
 Natural History Museum, Rotterdam : Mangelia miostriolata

miostriolata
Gastropods described in 1972